Quentin Gilbert (born 29 May 1989) is a French rally driver. He made his WRC debut in 2012 Rallye de France driving a Citroën DS3 R3T with his co-driver Tutelaire, Rémi.

In 2013, he competed in the WRC-3 championship, driving a Citröen DS3 R3T.

Career results

WRC results

WRC-3 results

WRC-2 results

Drive DMACK Cup results

JWRC results

References

1989 births
Living people
French rally drivers
World Rally Championship drivers
Citroën Racing drivers